The Vicar of Wakefield (Italian: Il vicario di Wakefield) is an Italian television series which first aired on RAI 1 in 1959. It is based on the 1766 novel The Vicar of Wakefield by Anglo-Irish writer Oliver Goldsmith.

Main cast
 Carlo D'Angelo
 Alberto Lupo
 Evi Maltagliati
 Ilaria Occhini
 Lily Tirinnanzi
 Mario Valdemarin

References

Bibliography
 Massimo Emanuelli. 50 anni di storia della televisione attraverso la stampa settimanale. GRECO & GRECO Editori, 2004.

External links
 

1959 Italian television series debuts
1959 television series endings
1950s Italian television series
Italian-language television shows
Television series set in the 18th century
Television shows based on British novels
RAI original programming